Pietro de Gozzo, O.P. (died 1564) was a Roman Catholic prelate who served as Bishop of Ston (1551–1564).

Biography
Pietro de Gozzo was ordained a priest in the Order of Preachers. On 25 Feb 1551, he was appointed by Pope Julius III as Bishop of Ston. He served as Bishop of Ston until his death in 1564.

References 

1564 deaths
16th-century Roman Catholic bishops in Croatia
Bishops appointed by Pope Julius III
Dominican bishops